Lea Vivier (born 15 January 1992) is a South African actress, best known for her leading role in the Showmax original series Dam (2021) and her appearances in the films The Day We Didn't Meet (2021) and Wonderlus (2017).

Personal life
Born in Cape Town, South Africa, to drama teacher Adri Troksie Vivier and senior advocate Pieter De Bruin Vivier, Lea Vivier was one of four siblings. Her elder sister, Trix Vivier, is also an actress, known for her role in the 2019 television series Trackers adapted from the Deon Meyer novel.

While at the Waterfront Theatre School studying classical ballet, contemporary dance, and drama, Vivier completed a year of Speech and Drama training through Trinity College London.

After completing her matric qualification at Jan van Riebeeck High School, Vivier travelled to Chile, where she became fluent in Spanish. After her return to South Africa, she spent a year at the University of Cape Town studying towards her Bachelor of Arts. She thereafter transferred to Rhodes University, in Makhanda (Grahamstown), to complete her degree, triple majoring in English Literature, Drama, and Afrikaans Dutch Studies in 2015.

Career
Though she appeared in a number of theatre productions, some of which featured at the National Arts Festival, Vivier's screen acting career began with her role in the film Wonderlus, directed by Johan Cronje. Vivier's performance as the unnamed waitress earned her the Best Actress award at the Silwerskerm Film Festival in 2017 and a nomination for Best Actress in the Winter Film Awards. The following year, she played the role of Louisa in the short film Runner, for which she won Best Actress in a Short Film at the Five Continents International Film Festival Award in April 2018.

She has since she appeared in a number of television series and serials, including Mense Mense, Die Spreeus, Fynskrif, Binnelanders, and The Girl from St Agnes.

In 2021, Vivier took the leading roles in the Showmax series Dam and Johan Cronje's The Day We Didn't Meet.

Most recently, Vivier performed as Madeline Evans in M-Net’s Legacy, and the Netflix series Ludik and Resident Evil.

Filmography
Film

Television

Awards
2018

Best Lead Actress in a Short Film at the Five Continents International Film Festival

2017

Best Actress at the Silwerskerm Film Festival

References

External links
 
 10 questions to Lea Vivier

Living people
South African television actresses
South African film actresses
People from Cape Town
Alumni of Hoërskool Jan van Riebeeck
1992 births